Balahibong Pusa is a 2001 Philippine drama film cinematographed and directed by Yam Laranas on his directorial debut. The film stars Joyce Jimenez, Elizabeth Oropesa, Julio Diaz, Jay Manalo and Rica Peralejo.

The story centers on a young woman Sarah (Jimenez) whose mother Vivian (Oropesa) new suitor Michael (Julio Diaz) is someone she is not fond of running for comfort to her boyfriend Michael (Jay Manalo) the tension even worsens when Michael’s daughter Becky (Peralejo) falls for Michael.

Cast
 Joyce Jimenez as Sarah
 Elizabeth Oropesa as Vivian
 Julio Diaz as Michael
 Jay Manalo as Nick
 Rica Peralejo as Becky
 Josie Galvez as Yaya Aning
 R.J. Leyran as Dave
 Lucy Quinto as Land Lady
 Phillip Lazaro as Jewel
 Doming Olivar as Wilbert
 Jon Antonio as Jungkey
 Angel Barcena as Mang Angel
 George Shoemaker as Mang Toto
 Charisse Leviste as Tricia
 Jenny Velasco as Candy
 Ging Yambao as Printing Press Manager
 Carmen del Rosario as Mildred
 Malou Enero as Fatima

References

External links

2001 films
2001 drama films
Filipino-language films
Philippine drama films
Viva Films films
Films directed by Yam Laranas